Sławomir Busch (born 3 March 1998) is a Polish volleyball player, a member of Poland men's national under-19 volleyball team and Italian club Avimecc Volley Modica, U20 European Champion 2016.

Career

National team
On September 10, 2016 he achieved title of the 2016 CEV U20 European Champion after winning 7 of 7 matches in tournament and beating Ukraine U21 in the finale (3-1).

Sporting achievements

National team
 2016  CEV U20 European Championship

References

External links
 SMS PZPS Spała player profile

1998 births
Living people
People from Nowy Tomyśl County
Sportspeople from Greater Poland Voivodeship
Polish men's volleyball players
AZS Częstochowa players